"Sippin' on Fire" is a song written by Cole Taylor, Matt Dragstrem and Rodney Clawson, and recorded by American country music duo Florida Georgia Line.  It is the third single from their second studio album, Anything Goes.

Critical reception
Website Taste of Country reviewed the single favorably, saying that "After pushing the edges of their sound with “Dirt” and “Sun Daze,” Hubbard, Brian Kelley and Moi return home with “Sippin’ on Fire,” the third single from Anything Goes. It’s a song that could have found its way on to Here’s to the Good Times."

Commercial performance
The song has sold 513,000 copies in the US as of July 2015. It was certified Platinum by the RIAA on January 29, 2016.

Music video
The music video was directed by Marc Klasfeld and premiered in March 2015. It features the duo and a full band performing the song from within a ring of fire in the Mojave Desert, and scenes of a man and woman walking towards each other from afar, eventually meeting at night and caressing around the ring of fire. Their images "melt away" in the fire as the video goes on.

Charts and certifications

Year-end charts

Certifications

References

2014 songs
2015 singles
Country ballads
2010s ballads
Florida Georgia Line songs
Republic Nashville singles
Songs written by Rodney Clawson
Song recordings produced by Joey Moi
Music videos directed by Marc Klasfeld
Republic Records singles
Songs written by Matt Dragstrem